Breiter als der Türsteher (B.A.D.T.) is the first solo album by German rapper Majoe. It was released on 5 September 2014 and includes 22 tracks on its premium edition.

Track listing

Singles and freetracks

References

External links
 Banger Musik website (in German)

2014 albums
Majoe albums